The Utrecht–Boxtel railway is an important railway in the Netherlands running from Utrecht Centraal station to Boxtel station, passing through Geldermalsen station and 's-Hertogenbosch station. The line was opened between 1868 and 1870. It is also known as the Staatslijn "H".

Stations
The main interchange stations on the Utrecht–Boxtel railway are:

Utrecht Centraal: to Amsterdam, Leiden, The Hague, Amersfoort, Arnhem and Rotterdam
Geldermalsen: to Dordrecht and Tiel
's-Hertogenbosch: to Tilburg and Nijmegen
Boxtel: to Tilburg and Eindhoven

Railway lines in the Netherlands
Railway lines opened in 1870
1870 establishments in the Netherlands
Railway lines in Utrecht (province)
Railway lines in Gelderland
Railway lines in North Brabant
Standard gauge railways in the Netherlands
Transport in 's-Hertogenbosch
Rail transport in Utrecht (city)
19th-century architecture in the Netherlands